Tuberculous dactylitis is a skeletal manifestation of tuberculosis, one of the commonest bacterial osteitis. It affects children more often than adults. The first radiological description of the condition is credited to Feilchenfeld in 1896; however, the first histological description was given by Rankin in 1886. The Swedish botanist and physician Carl von Linne was the first to mention the condition by the name "spina ventosa" 1746 in his "Västgöta resa".

Multiple bones are involved in children and usually only a single bone is involved in adults suffering from tuberculous dactylitis. Tuberculous dactylitis affects the short tubular bones of the hands and feet in children. It often follows a mild course without fever and acute inflammatory signs as opposed to acute osteomyelitis. There may be a gap of a few months to 2 to 3 years from the time of initial infection to the point of diagnosis.

Spina ventosa is the term given for tuberculous dactylitis. Nearly 85% of the patients of spina ventosa are below 6 years of age. The bones of hands are more commonly involved than those of the feet. Proximal phalanx of the index and middle fingers are the commonest sites of involvement. Up to nearly 7% of children with pulmonary tuberculosis may develop this condition. Spread to the skeletal system is believed to occur via blood and lymphatics.

Signs and symptoms

Pathogenesis 
In the pediatric age group, the marrow in the phalangeal bones are still active, a conducive place for the tuberculous bacilli to multiply. Slowly, the whole marrow space gets involved and this underlying granulomatous disease leads to expansion of the overlying soft cortex. Finally there is a fusiform dilation of the bone, with thinned out cortex and destruction of the marrow space leading to a balloon like shape; this cystic type of expansion of the bone is termed as spina ventosa.

Diagnosis 
The diagnosis of the condition is made on the basis of histological and bacteriological studies. Tuberculosis dactylitis may be confused with conditions like osteomyelitis, gout, sarcoidosis and tumors.

Treatment

References

External links 

Human diseases and disorders
Tuberculosis
Pediatrics